The Jur Beli (also, Jurbiel and Beli) are an ethnic group living in South Sudan.

References

Ethnic groups in South Sudan